Welcek Farmstead is a Czech American farmstead located in Kolin, Louisiana.  It was added to the National Register of Historic Places on July 18, 1985.

References

External links
Welcek Farmstead

Houses on the National Register of Historic Places in Louisiana
Houses in Rapides Parish, Louisiana
Czech-American culture in Louisiana
National Register of Historic Places in Rapides Parish, Louisiana